Sherwin Meneses is a Filipino volleyball coach. He is currently the head coach of the defending champion professional team, Creamline Cool Smashers, of the Premier Volleyball League (PVL). He also coached the Adamson Lady Falcons in the University Athletic Association of the Philippines (UAAP) and the Arellano Chiefs in the National Collegiate Athletic Association (NCAA).

Career
Sherwin Meneses has been the coach of the Lady Falcons, Adamson University's women's volleyball team from 2012 to 2016. He resigned his post on March 10, 2016 while UAAP Season 78 is still underway due to dispute with the management. He would then coach the Arellano Chiefs in the National Collegiate Athletic Association.

He would also coach the now-defunct Generika-Ayala Lifesavers of the Philippine Super Liga and led the Arellano men's volleyball team to a runner-up finish in the NCAA Season 93.

Meneses would be tapped to coach the Creamline Cool Smashers, of the Premier Volleyball League (PVL). He won his first title as coach when he helped Creamline clinch the 2022 Open Conference title.

Leaning on the steady hands of Tots Carlos and Jema Galanza who were the top two highest pointers for Creamline, Meneses bagged his second title as a pro head coach in the 2022 Invitational Conference and thought about continuing the system in order to win a third straight championship.

Head coach Meneses and the Creamline-powered Philippine National Team lost to five-time champion China in the AVC Cup last August 23, 2022, but bounced back the next day against Iran, with the host Philippines utilizing the calibers of AVC veteran and match topscorer Galanza, Carlos, and Gumabao.

References 

Filipino volleyball coaches
Living people
Year of birth missing (living people)

Adamson Lady Falcons women's volleyball coaches